Major Mangerira Chinnappa Muthanna was a war hero of India.

Early life
Mangerira Chinnappa Muthanna was born in Chettimani village (near Bhagamandala), Kodagu district (Coorg) on 21 April 1964.

Army service
He joined OTA, Chennai in Oct 1984 and was commissioned into the 5th Battalion the Sikh Light Infantry on 24 October 1985. He served the 5 Sikh Light Infantry-Hq 1 Sector Rashtriya Rifles. He died on 12 January 2000, aged 36 years, while fighting with terrorists of Lashker-e-Toiba (LeT) in Anantnag, Jammu and Kashmir.

Posthumous honour
He was awarded with the Shaurya Chakra posthumously. To commemorate him, a statue of the martyr was unveiled in front of the Madikeri City Municipal Council (CMC) and named the municipal circle in front of the Town Hall after him on Thursday, 9 December 2010. The statue, made of granite stone, was sculpted at a cost of Rs. 8 lakh by sculptor Manjunath Acharya of Beetikatte in Somwarpet.A high school operative under the Head quarter 1 sector RR in district Anantnag where the soldier was posted was later on named as Muthanna Army Goodwill School after his name Muthanna.la

References

1964 births
2000 deaths
Indian Army officers
Recipients of the Shaurya Chakra
Kodava people
People from Kodagu district
Indian military personnel killed in action